Semisulcospira libertina is a species of freshwater snail with an operculum, an aquatic gastropod mollusk in the family Semisulcospiridae. Widespread in east Asia, it lives in China, Taiwan, Korea, Japan, and the Philippines. In some countries it is harvested as a food source. It is medically important as a vector of clonorchiasis, paragonimiasis, metagonimiasis and others.

Taxonomy
The type specimens were collected by American scientist William Stimpson during the North Pacific Exploring and Surveying Expedition (1853–1856). This species was originally described under the name Melania libertina by American malacologist Augustus Addison Gould in 1859. The specific name libertina is from Latin language and means a "freedwoman". Semisulcospira libertina is the type species of the genus Semisulcospira by subsequent designation.

Kuroda (1963) and Habe (1965) considered S libertina a synonym of Semisulcospira bensoni.

The "S. libertina species complex" consist of three species: S. libertina, S. reiniana and S. kurodai, according to Davis (1969). Placement of S. kurodai within this species complex was confirmed by Oniwa and Kimura in 1986.

Distribution 

This species occurs in:
 South Korea: continental South Korea and Jeju Island.
 Central China: Hubei, East China: Anhui, Fujian, Jiangxi, Zhejiang and South China: Guangdong.
 Taiwan
 widespread in Japan It is the most common freshwater snail in Japan.
 This species was also reported from the Philippines.

The type locality was listed as "Simoda and Ousima" by Gould in 1859, that means two localities: Shimoda City in Honshu and Amami Ōshima in Ryukyu Islands. Davis (1979) identified the presumed type locality Inozawa River, Inozawa Section, Shimoda City, Izu Peninsula, Shizuoka Prefecture, Honshu. (Site 1 in Figure 4.)

Miura et al. (2013) studied mitochondrial haplotypes of Semisulcospira libertina from Korea and from Japan. Mixed haplotypes in Korea suggest long-distance palaeo-migration across the Korea Strait from Japan to Korea.

Shells of Semisulcospira libertina were also found in the Nojiri-ko Formation at the Lake Nojiri in Central Japan from the age of 27,000 years BP.

Description 
The shell has 4–6 whorls, while the apex of the shell is usually eroded. The spire is long. The aperture is continuous and the apertural lip is simple. Umbilicus is closed. The shell of Semisulcospira libertina is very variable. There are seven or more (up to 12) basal cords (spiral sculptures at the base of the body whorl). There are sometimes transverse ribs present on the shell sculpture: 12–18 ribs per penultimate whorl. Periostracum is smooth. The color of the shell is usually light yellow, but it can be light brown very rarely. The spire is darker yellowish-brown. Number of shells is banded with purple brown spiral bands, either with one band, two bands, or three bands.

The average width of the shell of Semisulcospira libertina is  – . The average height of the shell is  –  in Japan.

In Korea, the average width of the shell of Semisulcospira libertina is 12.55–19.37 mm. The average height of the shell is 6.44–9.20 mm. The average total wet weight is 0.24–0.86 g. The average weight of the shell is 0.16–0.62 g. The average weight of the meat is 0.09–0.39 g.

The extrema dimensions were measured in another locality in Korea: The total wet weight ranges from 0.30 g (shell height 9.87 mm) to 1.55 g (shell height 22.57 mm).

Mineral composition of the shell of this species is as follows: 52.9% CaO, 0.77% SiO2, 0.36% Na2O, 0.06% Al2O3, 0.05% Fe2O3, 0.01% MgO and 0.01% P2O5. There is 45.44% of citrulline of free amino acids (amino acids in blood).

Nelson Annandale depicted the operculum and radula of this species in 1924. Ko et al. (2001) described the radula of this species in detail. The shape of the operculum is ovate and the profile of the shape of the operculum is flat. Coiling of the operculum is paucispiral. Nucleus of the operculum is eccentric.

Cephalic tentacles are short (approximately the same size as the length of the snout).

The reproductive system in a male has the following parts: testis, vas deferens, the spermatophore organ. There is no penis. The reproductive system in a female has the following parts: ovary, the pallial oviduct, the spermatophore bursa, the seminal receptacle and the brood pouch.

The diploid chromosome number of Semisulcospira libertina is 2n=36. The complete mitochondrial genome of Semisulcospira libertina is known since 2015. Its length is 15,432 bp. It was the first mitochondrial genome resolved within the whole superfamily Cerithioidea.

Semisulcospira reiniana is very similar species: its embryos are larger and embryos are with ribs, adult shells are more slender, 2n=40.

Ecology

Habitat 

Habitats of Semisulcospira libertina include pools, slow flowing rivers, drainage ditches, rice paddies, streams. Kim (1970) studied the habitat of Semisulcospira libertina in Korea. The water temperature is 1.3–22.5 °C.

The pollution tolerance value is 3 (on scale 0–10; 0 is the best water quality, 10 is the worst water quality).

High concentration of cadmium may affect behavior of this species.

Feeding habits 
Semisulcospira libertina is polyphagous species and a grazer. It feeds mainly on phytoplankton and detritus. Chemoautotrophic bacteria are probable food source of Semisulcospira libertina, because δ13C and δ34S values were lower than in other invertebrates on the site.

There are 0.032 mg/g of carotenoids in the body of Semisulcospira libertina (shell exclude). Carotenoids composition include: β-Carotene 45%, lutein 13%, zeaxanthin 12%, canthaxanthin 6.5%, (3S,3'S)-astaxanthin 6.5%, (3S)-adonirubin, echinenone 3%, α-Carotene 2%, (3S,3'R)-adonixanthin 1%, fritschiellaxanthin 0.5%, traces of diatoxanthin, fucoxanthin, fucoxanthinol, and other carotenoids 4.5%. Beta-carotene is probably originated from green algae and from cyanobacteria. Lutein is from green algae. Zeaxanthin is from cyanobacteria. Other non-trace carotenoids are probably their oxidative metabolites.

Life cycle 

Semisulcospira libertina is gonochoristic, which means that each individual animal is distinctly male or female. Semisulcospira libertina is ovoviviparous. The whole larval development occur in the brood pouch of the female. Egg develops into the trochophore, preveliger, veliger, and to the juvenile. There is much of yolk in the embryo. The development from the egg to the veliger lasts 17 days in the temperature 25 ℃. The full development lasts about 8 months in winter and about 2 months in summer. Embryos are without ribs on the shell, but they usually have 1–2 spiral cords. The color of embryo is brown, sometimes yellow.

The female has over 80 small embryos in its brood pouch. Average number of embryos is 58–124 embryos in July. Average number of embryos is 222–570 embryos in November. A single female will usually gave birth to about 607–858 during one year. Recorded maximum was 1535 newborn snails in one year.

Female gave birth to newborn snails in temperature from 12 ℃ to 24 ℃. Birth of snails occur mainly in two periods: in March–May and in September–October. Newborn snails have a width of the shell 0.60–0.99 mm (maximum 1.22 mm). The height of a shell of a newborn snail is up to 1.73 mm. The shell of newborn snails has 2.0–3.5 whorls. The life span is about 2 years.

Parasites

Parasites of Semisulcospira libertina include the following flukes. Some of them are medically important:
 Opisthorchiidae: Semisulcospira libertina serves as the first intermediate host for Clonorchis sinensis in China.
 Paragonimidae: Semisulcospira libertina serves as the first intermediate host for Paragonimus westermani.
 Heterophyidae: Semisulcospira libertina serves as the first intermediate host for Metagonimus miyatai and Metagonimus yokogawai.
 Heterophyidae: Semisulcospira libertina serves as the first intermediate host for Centrocestus armatus and Centrocestus formosanus.
 Philophthalmidae: Cercariae of Philophthalmus sp. were found in Semisulcospira libertina in Japan.
 Liolopidae: Semisulcospira libertina serves as the first intermediate host for Liolope copulans.
 Derogenidae: Cercariae of Genarchopsis goppo were found in Semisulcospira libertina in Japan.
 Lecithodendriidae: Semisulcospira libertina serves as the first intermediate host for Acanthatrium hitaensis.

Shinagawa et al. (2001) studied the metabolism and activity of Semisulcospira libertina infected by trematodes.

Bacteria Neorickettsia risticii was detected in cercaria from Semisulcospira libertina in Korea.

Predators
Predators of Semisulcospira libertina include fireflies, such as aquatic larvae of firefly Luciola cruciata.

Human use

Culinary

Japan 
This species is used in Japanese cuisine.

Korea 
In Korean cuisine, daseulgi-guk is a type of guk (soup) made with Semisulcospira libertina.

Medicinal

Korea 
This species is used as medicinal species in traditional medicine practices on gastrointestinal disorders in Korea. Juice, panbroiled, powder, and simmer from the whole Semisulcospira libertina is used for cure of gastroenteric trouble in Jirisan National Park, Korea. Simmer from the whole Semisulcospira libertina is used for cure of indigestion in Jirisan National Park. Semisulcospira libertina is also used as clear soup with flour dumplings, infusion, juice, soup or as simmer for cure liver-related ailments in traditional medicine in the Southern Regions of Korea.

The non-intentional exposure to shell powder from this species caused the first reported silicosis of such origin in 2012.

References

Further reading 
 
 
 
 
 
 
 
 
 
 
  Kobelt W. (1879). "Fauna molluscorum extramarinorum Japoniae. Nach den von professor Rein gemachten sammlungen". Abhandlungen d. Senckenberg. naturf. gesellsch 1–171, 23 plates. page 128-130,  plate xviii, figs. 2–8; plate xix, figs. 2–5, 8.
 Mishima Y. (1973). "Production estimation of a freshwater snail, Semisulcospira bensoni (Philippi) (Mollusca: Gastropoda) in a rapid stream". Report from the Ebino Biological Laboratory, Kyushu University, 1: 49-63.

External links

  Semisulcospira libertina with extensive gallery

Semisulcospiridae
Gastropods of Asia
Edible molluscs
Invertebrates of China
Invertebrates of Korea
Fauna of the Philippines
Invertebrates of Taiwan
Gastropods described in 1859